Senate of the Republic was the upper house of Turkish Parliament between 1961 and 1980. It was established with the Turkish constitution of 1961 and abolished with the 1982 constitution, although it did not exist after 12 September 1980 as a result of the 1980 coup d'état.

History 

Although the Turkish Parliament was established in 1920 to replace the older Ottoman Parliament, which had an upper Senate and lower Chamber of Deputies, the new parliament was composed of a single chamber. The Turkish constitution of 1961 introduced an upper house called the Senate of the Republic, or Senate for short. The name Grand National Assembly of Turkey referred to the entire parliament including both houses. However, the activities of both houses of the parliament were suspended after the 1980 Turkish coup d'état. Under the 1982 constitution, the Senate was abolished.

Composition of the Senate 
The Senate was composed of 150 elected members and 15 members appointed by the president. There were also senators known as "natural members", who were the former presidents (including the president of Hatay Republic) and the 22 members of the 1960 coup d'état committee members. In the first year, the Senate was composed of 188 members.

Elections 
In the Senate elections of 1961, the election system of the Senate differed from that of the lower house. While the D'Hondt method was used for the lower house, majority system (winner takes all) was applied for the Senate. The outcome for the first senatorial election (with the exclusion of independents) was as follows:

After 1961, the obvious discrepancy between the percentage of the votes and the number of seats was severely criticized and before the next elections, the election system for the Senate was changed to the D'Hondt system as well on 17 April 1964.

Another difference was in the electoral period. The total legislation term was six years, where 1/3 of the seats were up for election every two years. The first election (for all 150 members) was held on 15 October 1961. The seats up for election were decided by casting lots for the  second and third elections. The last election was held on 14 October 1979.

See also 
 List of Chairmen of the Senate of Turkey
 Senate
 Senate of the Ottoman Empire

References 

 
Political history of Turkey
1961 establishments in Turkey
1982 disestablishments in Turkey
Defunct upper houses